Huanggang Port  is a port of entry on the border between mainland China and Hong Kong, in the Futian District of Shenzhen, China. Its counterpart in Hong Kong is the Lok Ma Chau Control Point, located in Lok Ma Chau in Hong Kong's New Territories, across the Sham Chun River from Huanggang.

Huanggang Port, close to Shenzhen city centre, is one of the five most important ports that connect the city and Hong Kong. On its west is the start of the Guangshen Expressway, which is the main thoroughfare connecting Shenzhen and Hong Kong. At present, it is both the largest comprehensive road crossings for passengers and cargo in China and one of the largest land crossings. Every day, about 20,000 vehicles pass through it. At the same time, it is also a passenger transit point. It is the second busiest in Shenzhen after Luohu Port and the third largest passenger crossing after the Gongbei Port in Zhuhai.

Operations
The east zone is for cargo checking while the west is for passenger checking. The east of the cargo checking area is the entry checking field, and the west is the exit checking field. There are also 52 bus checking channels, including 12 car checking channels and 40 truck checking channels, 20 for entry and 20 for exit (10 were built after the immigration control carried out the policy of fast access); there are 50 passenger checking channels, including 25 for entry and 25 for exit. The designed carrying capacity is 50 thousand concurrent vehicles, and 50 thousand concurrent passengers.

Huanggang Port is the only full-time port in China. Both passenger and cargo checking work all day. Cargo checking begins at 7:00 a.m. and closes at 22:00 p.m., while six channels remain open between 22:00—24:00 pm (two for entry and four for exit).

Public transport

Mass transit rail 
Huanggang Port connects with the Shenzhen Metro, Line 7 (Shenzhen Metro) at Huanggang Checkpoint station opened in October 2016. The counterpart Lok Ma Chau Checkpoint on the Hong Kong side is not accessible via Hong Kong's MTR system. Futian Port a few hundred metres from Huanggang Port but has large buildings in between making walking between the two impractical. Station nearby connects with Lok Ma Chau station on the MTR, although there is no direct metro connection between Huanggang and Futian nor between the 2 checkpoints on the Hong Kong side.

Cross-border buses

For improved passenger service, there are stops for direct buses and the ticket office  at Huanggang Port. The stops are at the south of the passenger checking building, and the east of the shuttle buses, and there are six parking spaces reserved for short-term buses, for passengers to get on the buses. The six ticket offices are temporarily on the south of the passenger checking building, and the east of the departure passageway.

There are many cross-border traffic routes in Huanggang Port, which lead to Tsim Sha Tsui, Mong Kok, Wan Chai, Tsuen Wan, Kam Sheung Road, Hong Kong Disneyland, and the International Airport in Hong Kong. Routes to Tsim Sha Tsui, Mong Kok, Wan Chai, Tsuen Wan, Kam Road work all day. There are also many buses between Huanggang Port and the Border Control Station in Lok Ma Chau in Hong Kong.

After the Huanggang port began 24/7 service, the number of passengers per day quickly increased from 50 thousand to 110 thousand per day, up to a maximum of 172,000. Every day, buses cross the border between 1000-1100 times, twice the normal number and far more than the designed capacity of the number of passengers and vehicles. To solve this problem, the authorities in Guangdong and Hong Kong agreed to provide a combined service of long and short-term buses. There are five groups of six routes of short-term buses between Huangguang Port and Hong Kong, which run between Wan Chai, Tsim Sha Tsui, Kwun Tong, Tsuen Wan, Mong Kok, and Kam Tin in Hong Kong and Huangguang Port, with the Mong Kok, and Kam Tin together in one group. It is run by 5 groups of companies made of 93 passenger transportation companies, and has been operating for 2 years. All the routes operate 24 hours a day except that the Kam Tin route, which works about 18 hours. The bus frequency of every route is at least 60 times. When busy, every 15 minutes and 30 minutes at less busy times and at midnight. Furthermore, buses of every route have the same color and the same ticket price to simplify management.

References

External links
 Journey to Hong Kong
 Huanggang Port

Shenzhen
China–Hong Kong border crossings
Futian District